Amadeo Rossi SA (or simply Rossi), founded in 1889 in São Leopoldo, Brazil, is a Brazilian arms manufacturer. Rossi produces pistols and revolvers used by both civilians and security forces, and exports worldwide. It is considered one of the largest weapons manufacturers in Brazil.

About

In the 1970s Rossis began to be distributed in the United States by Interarms Virginia. This continued until 1997, when Rossi founded BrazTech, their own subsidiary representative in North America . Their revolvers had great popularity in the United States, Canada and some countries in Europe.

The production line of revolvers and handguns was acquired by Taurus. Rossi currently produces only hunting rifles, shotguns and traditional line of Puma rifles. It also has a line of own airgun, known as Rossi Dione.

Since 2010, Rossi no longer produces firearms for sale in the Brazilian market, and dedicates itself exclusively to the importation and distribution of airguns and airsoft, a sport that remains popular in Brazil since its legalization. Rossi guns can still be found in the foreign market, made by Amadeo Rossi (exclusively for export) or by Taurus.

In Brazil Rossi distributes the airgun brands Beeman, Hatsan, SAG, Zoraki, Crossman, among others, besides airsofts brands HFC, CQB, Swiss Arms and Crossman.

Models 

 Rossi Model 971 .357 Magnum
 Rossi Model 13 “Princess” (.22 LR)
 Rossi R46102 .357 Magnum
 Rossi R35102 .38 Special
 Rossi R85104 .38 Special
 Rossi R46202 .357 Magnum
 Rossi R35202 .38 Special
 Rossi R97206 .357 Magnum
 Rossi Circuit Judge .410-bore/45LC & .22 LR (carbine)
 Rossi Tuffy is a single shot .410-bore shotgun. It features a half thumb-hole stock that holds four additional shot-shells and strongly resembles the original Snake Charmer shotgun. Unlike its predecessor, it also has ejectors that automatically expel spent shells.
 Rossi R92, a copy of the Winchester 1892, chambered in .357 Magnum, .44 Magnum, .45 Colt, .44-40 Winchester and .454 Casull

See also
 IMBEL another Brazilian firearms manufacturer

References

External links
 Official page
 Rossi USA

Companhia Brasileira de Cartuchos
Rossi Firearms 
Firearm manufacturers of Brazil
Defence companies of Brazil
Companies based in São Leopoldo
Manufacturing companies established in 1889
1889 establishments in Brazil
Brazilian brands